The 1978 ECAC Hockey Men's Ice Hockey Tournament was the 17th tournament in league history. It was played between March 7 and March 11, 1978. Quarterfinal games were played at home team campus sites, while the 'final four' games were played at the Boston Garden in Boston, Massachusetts. By reaching the championship game both, Boston College and Providence received invitations to participate in the 1978 NCAA Division I Men's Ice Hockey Tournament.

Format
The tournament featured three rounds of play, all of which were single-elimination. The top eight teams, based on winning percentage, qualified to participate in the tournament. In the quarterfinals the first seed and eighth seed, the second seed and seventh seed, the third seed and sixth seed and the fourth seed and fifth seed played against one another. In the semifinals, the highest seed plays the lowest remaining seed while the two remaining teams play with the winners advancing to the championship game and the losers advancing to the third place game.

Conference standings
Note: GP = Games played; W = Wins; L = Losses; T = Ties; Pct. = Winning percentage; GF = Goals for; GA = Goals against

Bracket
Teams are reseeded after the first round

Note: * denotes overtime period(s)

Quarterfinals

(1) Boston University vs. (8) New Hampshire

(2) Cornell vs. (7) Providence

(3) Clarkson vs. (6) Brown

(4) Rensselaer vs. (5) Boston College

Semifinals

(1) Boston University vs. (7) Providence

(5) Boston College vs. (6) Brown

Third Place

(1) Boston University vs. (6) Brown

Championship

(5) Boston College vs. (7) Providence

Tournament awards

All-Tournament Team
None

MOP
Joe Mullen (Boston College)

References

External links
ECAC Hockey
1977–78 ECAC Hockey Standings
1977–78 NCAA Standings

ECAC Hockey Men's Ice Hockey Tournament
ECAC tournament